A. L. Spoon House is a historic home located near Snow Camp, Alamance County, North Carolina. The house consists of a two-story, hall-and-parlor plan log house, with a timber frame side wing added about 1850.  Also on the property is a contributing a double-pen log barn.

It was added to the National Register of Historic Places in 1993.

References

Log houses in the United States
Houses on the National Register of Historic Places in North Carolina
Houses completed in 1850
Houses in Alamance County, North Carolina
National Register of Historic Places in Alamance County, North Carolina
Log buildings and structures on the National Register of Historic Places in North Carolina